Lall Bahadur Das is an Indian politician. He was elected to the Sikkim Legislative Assembly from West Pendam in the 2019 Sikkim Legislative Assembly election as a member of the Sikkim Krantikari Morcha. He was the speaker of the Sikkim Legislative Assembly. He resigned from the post of Speaker on 16 August 2022.

References

1953 births
Living people
Sikkim Krantikari Morcha politicians
Sikkim Democratic Front politicians
People from Namchi district
Sikkim MLAs 2019–2024
Speakers of the Sikkim Legislative Assembly